Bareela Sharif is a town and union council of Gujrat District, in the Punjab province of Pakistan. It is located at 32°45'0N 74°24'0E with an altitude of 273 metres (898 feet).

References

Union councils of Gujrat District
Populated places in Gujrat District